Erdenis Gurishta (born 24 April 1995) is an Albanian footballer who plays as a right-back for Vllaznia Shkodër in the Kategoria Superiore.

Career statistics

Club

References

1995 births
Living people
Footballers from Shkodër
Albanian footballers
Association football fullbacks
Albania under-21 international footballers
Albania international footballers
KF Vllaznia Shkodër players
KS Veleçiku Koplik players
Kategoria Superiore players
Kategoria e Parë players
Kategoria e Tretë players